Heliodorus of Athens was an ancient author who wrote fifteen books on the Acropolis of Athens, possibly about 150 BC.

References

External links
 

2nd-century BC writers
2nd-century BC geographers
Ancient Greek geographers